The Valence Congress was the ninth national congress of the French Socialist Party (Parti socialiste or PS). It took place from 23 to 25 October 1981, shortly after Mitterrand's 1981 election.

Results

Lionel Jospin was re-elected as First Secretary.

References

Congresses of the Socialist Party (France)
1981 in France
1981 in politics
1981 conferences